Murphey School is a historic school complex located near Hillsborough, Orange County, North Carolina. The Murphey School was built in 1923, and is a one-story, Spanish Revival style brick building with a hip-on-hip roof covered in pressed metal shingles resembling terra cotta tiles. The front facade features a projecting central hip roof front entrance.  Attached to the school is a one-story neoclassical style auditorium addition built in 1936 with a Doric order portico. Also on the property is a contributing 1 1/2-story bungalow style teacherage (c. 1923), well house (c. 1932), and water tower (c. 1936).

It was listed on the National Register of Historic Places in 2009.

The Murphey School Auditorium is the current home of Burning Coal Theatre Company.

References

School buildings on the National Register of Historic Places in North Carolina
Mission Revival architecture in North Carolina
Neoclassical architecture in North Carolina
School buildings completed in 1923
Hillsborough, North Carolina
Schools in Orange County, North Carolina
National Register of Historic Places in Orange County, North Carolina
Defunct schools in North Carolina
1923 establishments in North Carolina